"Sicko Mode" (stylized in all caps) is a song by American rapper Travis Scott. It features vocals from Canadian rapper Drake, who was credited on Apple Music but not on the Billboard Hot 100. It was originally released by Epic Records on August 3, 2018 as the third track from Astroworld (2018), before being released as the second single on August 21. It features additional uncredited vocals by American rapper and singer Swae Lee and late American rapper Big Hawk.  

Sicko Mode was Scott's first number one single on the US Billboard Hot 100, although Drake is not credited on the Billboard charts, as well as the first hip-hop song in history to spend at least 30 weeks in the chart's top ten region. It was universally acclaimed by critics, and received nominations for Best Rap Performance and Best Rap Song at the 61st Annual Grammy Awards.

The song contains a sample from "Gimme the Loot", written by The Notorious B.I.G. and Easy Mo Bee, as performed by the former and an interpolation from "I Wanna Rock", written and performed by Uncle Luke. On December 9, 2020, the song was certified Diamond by the Recording Industry Association of America (RIAA).

Composition
The song is in three distinct movements. There is the first movement, which starts from the beginning of the song to the one minute mark. The second movement starts at the one minute mark and ends a few seconds shy of the three minute mark. The third movement starts at the three minute mark to the end of the song. The first movement is written in the key of B-flat major, the second movement is written in the key of F-sharp minor, and the third movement is composed in the key of E-flat minor. The first movement reminiscences about a time with friends in winter. The second movement reminisces about past relationships with women. The third movement reminisces about the singer's high school years, but now enjoys the luxury of flying out of a fixed base operator. The overall theme of the song is about reminiscing about past events in the singers lives and where they are now.

Critical reception
"Sicko Mode" received critical acclaim, with some critics considering it the highlight of Astroworld. Writing for Rolling Stone, Christopher R. Weingarten deemed the "hard-knocking" track the "album highlight", while Brendan Klinkenberg from the same magazine described it as "the apex of Scott's synthetic instincts". Brian Josephs of Entertainment Weekly called it a "mini-suite of bangers". Roisin O'Connor of The Independent felt Drake "sounds more important on this record than he did at any point on his own recent release, Scorpion, with a ballsy, confident flow".

Chart performance
"Sicko Mode" debuted at number four on the US Billboard Hot 100, It reached number two following the release of its music video, first behind "Girls Like You" by Maroon 5 featuring Cardi B, and then behind "Thank U, Next" by Ariana Grande. It later became his first number one on the issue dated December 8, 2018, after seventeen weeks in the top 10, aided in part by the Skrillex remix. The single also became his first top 10 on the Radio Songs chart. It finished 3rd in Triple J's Hottest 100 2018. Reflecting on its commercial impact, Billboard magazine's Andrew Unterberger called the song "a three-part prog-rap odyssey that would've been unimaginable as a radio single years earlier, but which got audiences so hyped with its unexpected beat switches and back-and-forth hooks that the pop world had no choice but to meet it halfway".

"Sicko Mode" was the only number one hit during the 2010s decade to feature a key change.

Music video
The music video for "Sicko Mode" was directed by Dave Meyers and Travis Scott. It was released on October 19, 2018. The video starts off with Scott's red head on a building while a camera zooms into it, and cuts to the next scene of people getting back into some multi-colored houses. Following scenes show Drake walking a dog while being burned by an eclipse and Scott riding a horse. The video ends with Drake and Scott walking away. As of May 2022, the video has over a billion views.

Live performances
Travis Scott performed the song at the 2018 MTV Video Music Awards and the Super Bowl LIII halftime show.

Remixes and covers
On November 28, 2018, an electronic remix by American record producer Skrillex was released. The remix's accompanying audio and lyric videos were released to Scott's and Skrillex's  YouTube channels on the same day.

On February 28, 2020, Swae Lee released the single "Someone Said", based on his line from the song.

Personnel
Credits adapted from Tidal and liner notes.

Performance
 Travis Scott – vocals, songwriting
 Drake – vocals, songwriting
 Swae Lee – additional vocals, songwriting
 Big Hawk – additional vocals, songwriting
Production
 Rogét Chahayed – production, songwriting (Part I)
 Hit-Boy – production, songwriting (Part I)
 OZ – production, songwriting (Part II)
 Cubeatz – production, songwriting (Part II)
 Tay Keith – production, songwriting (Part III)
 Mike Dean – production assistance, songwriting
Mirsad Dérvic – programming, songwriting
Cydel Young – songwriting
Technical

 Travis Scott – recording engineer, mixing
 Ben Sedano – assistant engineer
 Jimmy Cash – assistant engineer
 Jon Scher – assistant engineer
 Sean Solymor – assistant engineer
 Mike Dean – mixing, mastering

Additional songwriting credits as pertaining to the samples: "I Wanna Rock" as performed by Luke, written by Luther Campbell, Harry Wayne Casey and Richard Finch; and "Gimme the Loot" as performed by The Notorious B.I.G., written by Christopher Wallace, Osten Harvey, Bryan Higgins, Trevor Smith, James Jackson, Malik Taylor, Keith Elam, Christopher Martin, Kamaal Fareed, Ali Shaheed Jones-Muhammad, Tyrone Taylor, Fred Scruggs, Kirk Jones and Chylow Parker.

Track listing

A-side
 "Sicko Mode" – 5:12

B-side
 "Sicko Mode" (Skrillex Remix) – 5:05

Charts

Weekly charts

Year-end charts

Decade-end charts

Certifications

Accolades

Release history

Notes

References

External links
 
 
 

2018 singles
2018 songs
Travis Scott songs
Drake (musician) songs
Billboard Hot 100 number-one singles
Epic Records singles
Music videos directed by Dave Meyers (director)
Song recordings produced by Cubeatz
Songs written by Cyhi the Prynce
Song recordings produced by Hit-Boy
Song recordings produced by Mike Dean (record producer)
Song recordings produced by Tay Keith
Songs written by Ali Shaheed Muhammad
Songs written by Busta Rhymes
Songs written by DJ Premier
Songs written by Drake (musician)
Songs written by Easy Mo Bee
Songs written by Harry Wayne Casey
Songs written by Hit-Boy
Songs written by Kevin Gomringer
Songs written by Mike Dean (record producer)
Songs written by Phife Dawg
Songs written by Q-Tip (musician)
Songs written by Richard Finch (musician)
Songs written by Rogét Chahayed
Songs written by Swae Lee
Songs written by the Notorious B.I.G.
Songs written by Tim Gomringer
Songs written by Travis Scott
Cactus Jack Records singles
Grand Hustle Records singles
Swae Lee songs